The 2018 Muntinlupa Cagers season is the 1st season of the franchise in the Maharlika Pilipinas Basketball League (MPBL).

Key dates
 June 12, 2018: Regular Season Begins.

Roster

Datu Cup

Standings

Game log

|- style="background:#bfb;"
| 1
| June 12
| Mandaluyong
| W 86–74
| Chito Jaime (17)
| Felix Apreku (16)
| Dave Moralde (5)
| Smart Araneta Coliseum
| 1–0
|- style="background:#bfb;"
| 2
| June 21
| Marikina
| W 85–76
| Chito Jaime (19)
| Felix Apreku (16)
| Allan Mangahas (8)
| Muntinlupa Sports Complex
| 2–0
|- style="background:#;"
| 3
| 
| 
| 
| 
|
| 
| 
| 
|- style="background:#;"
| 4
| 
| 
| 
| 
|
| 
| 
| 
|- style="background:#;"
| 5
| 
| 
| 
| 
|
| 
| 
| 
|- style="background:#;"
| 6
| 
| 
| 
| 
|
| 
| 
| 
|- style="background:#;"
| 7
| 
| 
| 
| 
|
| 
| 
| 
|- style="background:#;"
| 8
| 
| 
| 
| 
|
| 
| 
| 
|- style="background:#;"
| 9
| 
| 
| 
| 
|
| 
| 
| 
|- style="background:#;"
| 10
| 
| 
| 
| 
|
| 
| 
| 
|- style="background:#;"
| 11
| 
| 
| 
| 
|
| 
| 
| 
|- style="background:#;"
| 12
| 
| 
| 
| 
|
| 
| 
| 
|- style="background:#;"
| 13
| 
| 
| 
| 
|
| 
| 
| 
|- style="background:#;"
| 14
| 
| 
| 
| 
|
| 
| 
| 
|- style="background:#;"
| 15
| 
| 
| 
| 
|
| 
| 
| 
|- style="background:#;"
| 16
| 
| 
| 
| 
|
| 
| 
| 
|- style="background:#;"
| 17
| 
| 
| 
| 
|
| 
| 
| 
|- style="background:#;"
| 18
| 
| 
| 
| 
|
| 
| 
| 
|- style="background:#;"
| 19
| 
| 
| 
| 
|
| 
| 
| 
|- style="background:#;"
| 20
| 
| 
| 
| 
|
| 
| 
| 
|- style="background:#;"
| 21
| 
| 
| 
| 
|
| 
| 
| 
|- style="background:#;"
| 22
| 
| 
| 
| 
|
| 
| 
| 
|- style="background:#;"
| 23
| 
| 
| 
| 
|
| 
| 
| 
|- style="background:#;"
| 24
| 
| 
| 
| 
|
| 
| 
| 
|- style="background:#;"
| 25
| 
| 
| 
| 
|
| 
| 
|

References

Muntinlupa Cagers Season, 2018